The Last Dance (Italian: L'ultimo ballo) is a 1941 Italian "white-telephones" comedy film directed by Camillo Mastrocinque and starring Elsa Merlini, Amedeo Nazzari and Renato Cialente. It is considered to be in the tradition of White Telephone films, popular during the Fascist era. It is based on a play by the Hungarian writer Ferenc Herczeg and features Merlini in a dual role as mother and daughter.

It was shot at Cinecittà Studios in Rome. The film's sets were designed by the art director Alfredo Montori.

Cast
 Elsa Merlini as La baronessa Titta Marcus & la baronessina Giuditta Marcus 
 Amedeo Nazzari as Il professore Stefano Boronkay 
 Renato Cialente as Andrea Marcus 
 Paolo Stoppa as Felix 
 Margherita Bagni as La vedova Jurika 
 Nerio Bernardi as Il pittore Blanche 
 Armando Migliari as Il capo cameriere Vittorio 
 Carlo Minello as Marcello 
 Luisa Garella as La Zelinger, l'amica pettegola 
 Nando Tamberlani as Il rettore de l'Universita 
 Enrico Luzi as Il fattorino curioso 
 Sussy Dewy as La bionda nel notturno 
 Vittoria Mongardi as La bruna accompagnata nel locale notturno 
 Alessandra Foscari as Una ragazza nel locale notturno 
 Giulia Martinelli as Una ragazza nel locale notturno

References

Bibliography 
 Moliterno, Gino. Historical Dictionary of Italian Cinema. Scarecrow Press, 2008.
 Piero Pruzzo & Enrico Lancia. Amedeo Nazzari. Gremese Editore, 1983.

External links 
 

1941 films
Italian comedy films
Italian black-and-white films
1941 comedy films
1940s Italian-language films
Films directed by Camillo Mastrocinque
Films shot at Cinecittà Studios
1940s Italian films